William Montague Charles Gummow  (born 9 October 1942) is a former Justice of the High Court of Australia, the highest court in the Australian court hierarchy. He was appointed to the Court of Final Appeal of Hong Kong on 8 April 2013 as a non-permanent judge from other common law jurisdictions.

Early life and education
Justice Gummow completed his secondary education at Sydney Grammar School. He went on to study at the University of Sydney, where he graduated as Bachelor of Arts, and later Master of Laws, both with first-class honours. One of his lecturers was Sir Anthony Mason.

Career

Early legal career
Gummow first practiced as a solicitor with law firm Allen Allen and Hemsley. He was admitted as a solicitor in 1966 and became a partner of the firm in 1969. He had a diverse practice, including banking law, trusts and revenue law, intellectual property litigation, commercial transactions and some constitutional law.

Barristerial career
After 10 years in practice as a solicitor, Gummow was called to the New South Wales Bar in 1976. At the bar, his practice included equity, commercial, tax and intellectual property matters. It also included large constitutional issues and in several cases he appeared as a junior to then Commonwealth Solicitor-General, Maurice Byers. Gummow was appointed a Queen's Counsel in 1986.

Judicial career
In 1986, Justice Gummow was appointed to the Federal Court of Australia. He was appointed to the High Court of Australia in April 1995. He retired from the High Court on 8 October 2012, upon reaching the constitutionally mandatory retirement age of 70. On 8 April 2013, he was appointed to the Court of Final Appeal of Hong Kong as a non-permanent judge from other common law jurisdictions.

Academic career
For 30 years, from the year of his graduation until his appointment as a judge, Gummow taught at the Faculty of Law at the University of Sydney. He lectured in equity from 1970 to 1995. Gummow's essay Legal Education (1988) emphasised the importance of statutes and legal history; areas he considers were and are insufficiently taught in Australian law schools. He further advocated the need for practitioners in legal education, who were exposed to 'the law in action'.

Following his retirement from the High Court of Australia, Gummow was appointed a Professor of the Sydney Law School, where he gives guest lectures, and a professor at the Australian National University (ANU) College of Law, where he teaches in the constitutional, equity, conflict of laws and refugee law programs.

Jurisprudence
Gummow's judgments are notable for their careful attention to statutory language and context, and are marked by a thorough and scholarly examination of doctrinal history. Gummow is particularly known for his contribution to intellectual property law and equity.

Any attempt to select notable judgments of Justice Gummow is made difficult because he is so often a participant in joint judgments, whose authorship cannot be attributed. However, some of his more notable individual opinions include: Breen v Williams, Kable v Director of Public Prosecutions for New South Wales, The Wik Peoples v The State of Queensland, Hill trading as R F Hill & Associates v Van Erp, Pyrenees Shire Council v Day, Scott v Davis, Roxborough v Rothmans of Pall Mall, and Al-Kateb v Godwin.

Gummow is also the author of, or participant in, numerous leading judgments in intellectual property law. See, for example: Werner & Co v Bailey Aluminium Products (1989), Advanced Building Systems v Ramset Fasteners (1998), Prestige Group v Dart Industries (1990), ConAgra v McCain Foods (1992).

Statistics in recent years have consistently shown Justice Gummow to be most likely to participate or be joined in a majority opinion. He only dissented once in 2006, out of 55 judgments. Justice Gummow also often joins with Justice Hayne; in 2006 this number was 40 (75.47%) joint judgments. Similarly, in the same year Justices Gummow and Hayne joined each other in judgment in all 11 constitutional cases. Michael McHugh, who served on the court with Gummow for ten years, has called Gummow as a "great judicial politician", referring to his ability to convince other justices of the court to join in his opinions.

Publications
Gummow has written extensively and has published numerous essays and articles.

He is the author of books including Change and Continuity: Statute, Equity, and Federalism, which is based upon the lectures he delivered at Oxford University in 1999 as part of the Clarendon law lectures series. These lectures take up themes of continuity and change in the law, particularly as they appear in the great common law jurisdictions.

He is a co-author of Jacobs' Law of Trusts in Australia, and Equity: Doctrines and Remedies, the pre-eminent text on equity in Australia. Gummow also wrote, with Dyson Heydon and Robert Austin, several editions of Cases and Materials on Equity and Trusts (4th ed, 1993).

Personal life
Gummow is unmarried and protective of his personal life.

In 2018, Gummow suffered a blood clot in a leg following a long-haul flight and had to have part of his leg amputated in Sydney.

Honours
Gummow was appointed a Companion of the Order of Australia (AC), Australia's highest civil honour, in 1997, and awarded the Centenary Medal in 2001.

The University of Sydney honoured Gummow's scholarly contributions to the law by conferring him with an honorary doctorate in law (LLD).

References

1942 births
Australian people of Cornish descent
Australian King's Counsel
Living people
Companions of the Order of Australia
Judges of the Federal Court of Australia
Justices of the High Court of Australia
People educated at Sydney Grammar School
Sydney Law School alumni
Australian judges on the courts of Hong Kong
Justices of the Court of Final Appeal (Hong Kong)
Hong Kong judges